Sead Kajtaz (born 14 February 1963) is a Bosnian retired footballer and manager. He was capped once for the Yugoslavia national football team. He is the father of Croatian swimmer Amina Kajtaz.

International career
He made his debut for Yugoslavia in a May 1986 friendly match away against Belgium in which he came on as a late substitute for Haris Škoro. It remained his sole international appearance.

Later years
After retiring, he kept linked with FK Velež Mostar where he held many different positions, from president, sports director and coach.

Honours

Player

Club
Velež Mostar 
Yugoslav Cup: 1985–86

References

External links
 

1963 births
Living people
Sportspeople from Mostar
Association football forwards
Yugoslav footballers
Yugoslavia international footballers
FK Velež Mostar players
1. FC Nürnberg players
Yugoslav First League players
Bundesliga players
Yugoslav expatriate footballers
Expatriate footballers in Germany
Yugoslav expatriate sportspeople in Germany
Bosnia and Herzegovina football managers